Radek Boháč (born 26 December 1977 in Prague) is a Czech curler and coach.

At the national level, he is a Czech men's champion curler (2018), Czech mixed champion curler (2010) and Czech mixed doubles champion curler (2011).

Teams

Men's

Mixed

Mixed doubles

Record as a coach of national teams

Personal life
He started curling in 2001 at the age of 24.

References

External links

Living people
1977 births
Sportspeople from Prague
Czech male curlers
Czech curling champions
Competitors at the 2003 Winter Universiade
Czech curling coaches